Karol Rovelto, née Damon (born December 20, 1969) is a retired American high jumper.

She finished eighth at the 1994 World Cup.

She also competed at the 1999 World Indoor Championships, the 1999 World Championships and the 2000 Summer Olympics.

Her personal best jump was 1.97 metres, achieved in June 2003 in Palo Alto.

She was born in Austin, Texas.

References

External links

1969 births
Living people
American female high jumpers
Olympic track and field athletes of the United States
Athletes (track and field) at the 1995 Pan American Games
Athletes (track and field) at the 2000 Summer Olympics
Sportspeople from Austin, Texas
Pan American Games track and field athletes for the United States
21st-century American women